The 1st Florida Cavalry Regiment was a Confederate army unit during the U.S. Civil War, originally organized in July 1861 at Tallahassee.  Members of the regiment came primarily from Alachua, Clay, Columbia, Duval, Leon, Levy, Nassau and Suwannee counties.  It left for the western theater in 1862.

Assignments
Department of West Florida, April - October 1861
 Department of Alabama and West Florida, October 1861
 Army of Pensacola, Department of Alabama and West Florida, October 1861 - February 1862

Battles
Scouting activities around Union occupied Fernandina Beach in 1861

Siege of Knoxville, September—December 1863
Kentucky Campaign
Battle of Chickamauga 
Battle of Chattanooga 
Atlanta Campaign
Tennessee Campaigns (Franklin-Nashville Campaign, Second Battle of Franklin, and Battle of Nashville) of John Bell Hood
Carolinas Campaign

The 1st Florida Cavalry Regiment surrendered in North Carolina in April 1865.

See also
Florida Civil War Confederate Units

References

External links
Members of the Florida 1st Cavalry - Florida State University

1861 establishments in Florida
 
Units and formations of the Confederate States Army from Florida